The 2012 NCAA Division I men's basketball tournament was a single-elimination tournament involving 68 schools playing to determine the national champion of men's NCAA Division I college basketball. The 74th edition of the tournament began on March 13, 2012, and concluded with the championship game on April 2 at the Mercedes-Benz Superdome in New Orleans.

The Final Four consisted of Kentucky, making their second appearance in the Final Four under John Calipari, Louisville, making their second appearance under Rick Pitino and first since 2005, Kansas, making their first appearance since winning the 2008 national championship under head coach Bill Self by defeating Calipari's Memphis team, and Ohio State, making their first appearance since their runner-up finish in 2007 and second under coach Thad Matta.

Kentucky defeated Kansas 67-59 to win their first national championship since Tubby Smith led the team there in 1998. This was Calipari's first national championship in four trips to the Final Four, having previously gone there with Kentucky in 2011, Memphis in 2008 and Massachusetts in 1996.

Upsets were once again the story of the tournament in 2012, and for the first time ever two #15 seeds won in the same tournament. In the South Region, #15 Lehigh of the Patriot League defeated #2 Duke. In the West Region, #15 Norfolk State of the MEAC, making their first ever NCAA tournament appearance, defeated #2 Missouri as a 21.5 point underdog, the second biggest upset in terms of point spread in NCAA tournament history, behind Fairleigh Dickinson's defeat of Purdue in 2023, where Purdue was a 23.5 point favorite.

In addition to this, Ohio won a game as a double digit seed for the second time in four tournaments as the #13 seed Bobcats defeated #4 seed Michigan to advance to the third round of the Midwest Region. A team from the First Four games also won in the Round of 64 for the second consecutive year as South Florida defeated Midwest #5 seed Temple, setting up a #12 vs. #13 matchup that Ohio won.

Virginia Commonwealth, a Final Four team from 2011 as an #11 seed, made the 2012 tournament as a #12 seed and once again made the round of 32 by defeating South #5 seed Wichita State. The South Region saw four double digit seeds win in their opening games, as Colorado and Xavier joined VCU and Lehigh as victors. Xavier advanced to the Sweet Sixteen, where they were defeated by Baylor.

Despite the upsets, all four top seeds advanced to the Sweet Sixteen for the first time since 2009. Three made it to the Elite Eight, as only Michigan State of the West Region lost. Kentucky was the only one to advance to the Final Four as Syracuse and North Carolina lost in their regional finals.

Two teams made their first NCAA tournament appearances in school history: MEAC champion Norfolk State and Summit League champion South Dakota State. Ivy League champion Harvard made its first appearance since 1946, ending the longest tournament drought in NCAA history.

All four teams from the state of Ohio (Cincinnati, Ohio, Ohio State, and Xavier) made it to the Sweet 16, marking the first time in tournament history any state has been represented by four teams in the round of 16. This tournament was also the first tournament since 1985 to feature no teams in the Sweet 16 from the Mountain or Pacific Time Zones.

It is also the first tournament (and only time) ever that both national semifinals and the national championship game were regular season rematches.

Tournament procedure

A total of 68 teams entered the tournament. Thirty out of 31 automatic bids were given to the teams that won their conference tournament. The remaining automatic bid was awarded to the Ivy League regular season champion since they do not hold a conference tournament. The remaining 37 teams were granted "at-large" bids, which were extended by the NCAA Selection Committee on March 11.

Eight teams—the four lowest-seeded automatic qualifiers and the four lowest-seeded at-large teams—will play in the First Four (the successor to what had been popularly known as "play-in games" through the 2010 tournament). The winners of these games will advance to the main draw of the tournament.

For the first time ever, the Selection Committee publicly disclosed the overall rankings for each team, which are listed below.

Schedule and venues

The following are the sites selected to host each round of the 2012 tournament:

First Four
March 13 and 14
University of Dayton Arena, Dayton, Ohio (Host: University of Dayton)

Second and third rounds
March 15 and 17
Rose Garden, Portland, Oregon (Host: University of Oregon)
University Arena ("The Pit"), Albuquerque, New Mexico (Host: University of New Mexico)
Consol Energy Center, Pittsburgh, Pennsylvania (Host: Duquesne University)
KFC Yum! Center, Louisville, Kentucky (Host: University of Louisville)
March 16 and 18
Nationwide Arena, Columbus, Ohio (Host: Ohio State University)
CenturyLink Center Omaha, Omaha, Nebraska (Host: Creighton University)
Bridgestone Arena, Nashville, Tennessee (Host: Ohio Valley Conference)
Greensboro Coliseum, Greensboro, North Carolina (Host: Atlantic Coast Conference)

Regional semifinals and Finals (Sweet Sixteen and Elite Eight)
March 22 and 24
East Regional, TD Garden, Boston, Massachusetts (Host: Boston College)
West Regional, US Airways Center, Phoenix, Arizona (Host: Arizona State University)
March 23 and 25
Midwest Regional, Edward Jones Dome, St. Louis, Missouri (Host: Saint Louis University)
South Regional, Georgia Dome, Atlanta, Georgia (Host: Georgia Institute of Technology)

National semifinals and championship (Final Four and championship)
March 31 and April 2
Mercedes-Benz Superdome (Host: Tulane University)

Qualification and selection teams

Automatic bids
The following teams were automatic qualifiers for the 2012 NCAA field by virtue of winning their conference's tournament (except for the Ivy League, whose regular-season champion received the automatic bid).

Tournament seeds (list by region) 

*See First Four.

Bracket
* – Denotes overtime period

Unless otherwise noted, all times listed are Eastern Daylight Time (UTC-04)

First Four – Dayton, Ohio
The First Four games involved eight teams: the four overall lowest-ranked teams, and the four lowest-ranked at-large teams.

Both games on March 13 saw historic comebacks:
 In the opener, Western Kentucky trailed by 16 points with 4:51 remaining before storming back to win 59–58. It was the largest comeback in the last five minutes of an NCAA tournament game; the previous record was 15 by Illinois against Arizona in the 2005 Elite Eight.
 In the second game of the night, BYU set a record for the largest comeback in an NCAA tournament game, as they were down by 25 points at one point and came back to beat Iona 78–72. The largest previous deficit overcome in the tournament was 22 points by Duke against Maryland in the 2001 national semifinals.
In addition, the March 13 session was notable for the attendance of Barack Obama, president of the United States, and David Cameron, prime minister of Great Britain. Cameron was in the U.S. for bilateral political and economic talks with Obama.

South Regional – Atlanta, Georgia

South Regional all-tournament team
Regional all-tournament team: Quincy Acy, Baylor; Anthony Davis, Kentucky; Doron Lamb, Kentucky; Christian Watford, Indiana.

Regional most outstanding player: Michael Kidd-Gilchrist, Kentucky

West Regional – Phoenix, Arizona

West Regional all-tournament team
Regional all-tournament team: Bradley Beal, Florida; Gorgui Dieng, Louisville; Draymond Green, Michigan State; Peyton Siva, Louisville.

Regional most outstanding player: Chane Behanan, Louisville

East Regional – Boston, Massachusetts

East Regional all-tournament team
Regional all-tournament team: Scoop Jardine, Syracuse; Lenzelle Smith, Jr., Ohio State; Jordan Taylor, Wisconsin; Deshaun Thomas, Ohio State.

Regional most outstanding player: Jared Sullinger, Ohio State

Midwest Regional – St. Louis, Missouri

Midwest Regional all-tournament team
Regional all-tournament team: Walter Offutt, Ohio; Tyshawn Taylor, Kansas; Jeff Withey, Kansas; Tyler Zeller, North Carolina.

Regional most outstanding player: Thomas Robinson, Kansas

Final Four – Mercedes-Benz Superdome, New Orleans, Louisiana

Final Four all-tournament team
Final Four all-tournament team: Anthony Davis, Kentucky; Michael Kidd-Gilchrist, Kentucky; Doron Lamb, Kentucky; Thomas Robinson, Kansas; Tyshawn Taylor, Kansas

Final Four most outstanding player: Anthony Davis, Kentucky

Game summaries

Final Four

National Championship

Record by conference

The R64, R32, S16, E8, F4, CG, and NC columns indicate how many teams from each conference were in the round of 64 (second round), round of 32 (third round), Sweet 16, Elite Eight, Final Four, championship game, and national champion, respectively.

Media

Television
2012 marked the second year of a 14-year partnership between CBS Sports and Turner Broadcasting cable networks TBS, TNT and truTV to cover the entire tournament under the NCAA March Madness banner. CBS aired the Final Four and championship rounds for the 31st consecutive year.

Studio hosts
Greg Gumbel (New York City and New Orleans) – Second Round, Third round, Regionals, Final Four and National Championship Game
Ernie Johnson Jr. (New York City and Atlanta) – First Four, Second round, Third round and Regional Semi-Finals
Matt Winer (Atlanta) – First Four, Second round and Third round

Studio analysts
Greg Anthony (New York City and New Orleans) – First Four, second round, Third round, Regionals, Final Four and National Championship Game
Charles Barkley (New York City and New Orleans) – First Four, second round, Third round, Regionals, Final Four and National Championship Game
Mike Brey (Atlanta) – Third round
Seth Davis (Atlanta and New Orleans) – First Four, second round, Third round, Regional Semi-Finals, Final Four and National Championship Game
Steve Lavin (New York City) – Third round
Frank Martin (New York City) – Regional Finals
Shaka Smart (Atlanta) – Regional Semi-Finals
Kenny Smith (New York City and New Orleans) – First Four, second round, Third round, Regionals, Final Four and National Championship Game
Steve Smith (Atlanta) – First Four, second round, Third round and Regional Semi-Finals
Jay Wright (Atlanta) – First Four and Second Round

Announcing teams
Jim Nantz/Clark Kellogg/Steve Kerr/Tracy Wolfson – First Four at Dayton, Ohio; Second and third round at Greensboro, North Carolina; South Regionals at Atlanta, Georgia; Final Four at New Orleans, LouisianaKerr joined Nantz and Kellogg during the First Four, Final Four, and National Championship games
Marv Albert/Steve Kerr/Craig Sager – Second and third round at Omaha, Nebraska; Midwest Regionals at St. Louis, Missouri
Verne Lundquist/Bill Raftery/Lesley Visser – Second and third round at Louisville, Kentucky; East Regionals at Boston, Massachusetts
Kevin Harlan/Len Elmore/Reggie Miller/Marty Snider – Second and third round at Pittsburgh, Pennsylvania; West Regionals at Phoenix, Arizona
Ian Eagle/Jim Spanarkel/Lewis Johnson – First Four at Dayton, Ohio; Second and third round at Nashville, Tennessee
Brian Anderson/Dan Bonner/Jenn Hildreth – Second and third round at Portland, Oregon
Tim Brando/Mike Gminski/Otis Livingston – Second and third round at Columbus, Ohio
Spero Dedes/Bob Wenzel/Jaime Maggio – Second and third round at Albuquerque, New Mexico

Number of games per network
 CBS: 26
 TBS: 16
 TruTV: 13
 TNT: 12

Radio
Dial Global Sports (formerly Westwood One) and SiriusXM  have live broadcasts of all 67 games.

First Four
Dave Ryan and Alaa Abdelnaby – at Dayton, Ohio

Second and third round
Kevin Calabro and Bill Frieder – Second and third round at Portland, Oregon
Dave Sims and Michael Cage – Second and third round at Albuquerque, New Mexico
Scott Graham and Kevin Grevey – Second and third round at Pittsburgh, Pennsylvania
Ted Robinson and Kyle Macy – Second and third round at Louisville, Kentucky
Wayne Larrivee and John Thompson – Second and third round at Columbus, Ohio
Kevin Kugler and Tom Brennan – Second and third round at Omaha, Nebraska
Brad Sham and Pete Gillen – Second and third round at Nashville, Tennessee
Gary Cohen and Reid Gettys – Second and third round at Greensboro, North Carolina

Regionals
Kevin Kugler and Pete Gillen – East Regional at Boston, Massachusetts
Wayne Larrivee and Fran Fraschilla – Midwest Regional at St. Louis, Missouri
Ian Eagle and John Thompson – South Regional at Atlanta, Georgia
Dave Sims and Bill Frieder – West Regional at Phoenix, Arizona

Final Four
Kevin Kugler, John Thompson and Bill Raftery – New Orleans, Louisiana

Courts
All tournament sites continued to use the uniform courts that were first introduced tournament-wide in 2010, except for a slight variation at the East Regionals in Boston at the TD Garden, where a parquet floor court pattern similar to that used by the hometown Boston Celtics was used.

See also
 2012 NCAA Division II men's basketball tournament
 2012 NCAA Division III men's basketball tournament
 2012 NCAA Division I women's basketball tournament
 2012 NCAA Division II women's basketball tournament
 2012 NCAA Division III women's basketball tournament
 2012 National Invitation Tournament
 2012 Women's National Invitation Tournament
 2012 NAIA Division I men's basketball tournament
 2012 NAIA Division II men's basketball tournament
 2012 NAIA Division I women's basketball tournament
 2012 NAIA Division II women's basketball tournament
 2012 College Basketball Invitational
 2012 CollegeInsider.com Postseason Tournament

References

 
NCAA Division I men's basketball tournament
21st century in New Orleans
Basketball
NCAA Division I men's basketball tournament
NCAA Division I men's basketball tournament
NCAA Division I men's basketball tournament
Sports in Portland, Oregon